The Lakeside Ballroom, also known as the Lakeside Pavilion, is a historic building located in Guttenberg, Iowa, United States. It is located next to the Mississippi River near a backwater known as Bussey Lake. The first part of the building was completed in 1927 by local contractor Louis Schroeder for $17,000.  William (Bill) Kann Sr. had the facility built as the Lakeside Pavilion, and it was operated by two of his sons, Edmund and William Jr. They sold the building in 1935 and it was expanded and converted into a ballroom.  Many local and national music acts performed at Lakeside, including: Jesse Stone, Jimmy Wade, Wayne King and their orchestras.

The building is a  rectangle, except for entrances on the east and north sides and a small room to the southwest corner that was reportedly used to store alcohol during Prohibition.  It was listed on the National Register of Historic Places in 2002.

References

Buildings and structures completed in 1935
Music venues in Iowa
Guttenberg, Iowa
Buildings and structures in Clayton County, Iowa
National Register of Historic Places in Clayton County, Iowa
Event venues on the National Register of Historic Places in Iowa